Shri Kshetra Ale, Tal. Junnar, Dist. Pune.

Ale is a small village residing  on intersection of Nagar-kalyan highway and Pune-Nashik highway in Junnar Taluka of Pune District of Maharashtra state in India

Importance

Historical Importance:

Many saints and mahants, brave king Chhatrapati Shivaji Maharaj and many Mahatmas were born in this city which is the land of saints. Sreesanth Dnyaneshwar's study reveals that he spoke a unique Veda of a world famous animal.

Venue: Ale Reda Samadhi, Junnar, Pune

Elevation: 860 m.

The intersection of National Highway 50 and National Highway 222, hence it is a very important market place.

A village named Ale is near from alephata. The land of Ale is holy by the visit of saint Dnyaneshwar who wrote famous Hindu granth Dyaneshwari.
About educational richness; the area is surrounded by schools, college having all general streams which includes B.A, BCom, BSc, and other specialization including BCA, BCS, BHMS, Engineering & Pharmacy offering both Diploma and Degree.

References

Villages in Pune district